Frank Willy Larsen (born 15 September 1965 in Ringerike) is a Norwegian politician for the Labour Party.

He served as a deputy representative to the Norwegian Parliament from Buskerud during the term 1997–2001. From 2000 to 2001 he was a regular representative, covering for Thorbjørn Jagland who was appointed to the first cabinet Stoltenberg.

Larsen was a member of the executive committee of Ringerike municipality council from 1999 to 2001. He was later hired in administrative positions (as rådmann) in Værøy and Halden.

References

1965 births
Living people
Members of the Storting
Labour Party (Norway) politicians
Buskerud politicians
Nord-Trøndelag University College alumni
Copenhagen Business School alumni
21st-century Norwegian politicians
20th-century Norwegian politicians
People from Ringerike (municipality)